Agy or AGY may refer to:

 Agy, a commune in  Basse Normandie, France
 Southern Alta language (ISO 639 code: agy), a language of the Philippines
 Anglesey, island in Wales, Chapman code
 Argyle Downs Airport, IATA code "AGY"

See also 
 Agi (disambiguation)
 Aggie (disambiguation)